Slow Traffic to the Right is the second album by jazz woodwind player Bennie Maupin, released in 1977.

Track listing

"It Remains to Be Seen" – 8:01
"Eternal Flame" – 4:34
"Water Torture" – 4:52
"You Know The Deal" (June Monteiro, Kevin Eggel Jackson) - 7:03
"Lament" (Onaje Allan Gumbs) - 1:52
"Quasar" - 5:53
All compositions by Bennie Maupin except where noted

Personnel

Bennie Maupin - soprano saxophone, tenor saxophone, saxello, piccolo, flute, alto flute, bass clarinet, Oberheim Polyphonic synthesizer, background vocals
Patrice Rushen - acoustic piano, Rhodes piano, clavinet 
Onaje Allan Gumbs - piano (on 5)
Ralph Armstrong - G3 Gibson bass (except 1,2)
Paul Jackson - custom bass (on 1,2)
James Levi - drums
Blackbird McKnight - electric guitar
Eddie Henderson - trumpet, flugelhorn
Craig Kilby - trombone
Nathan Rubin - concert master, strings
Pat Gleeson - Oberheim and E-Mu Polyphonic synthesizer

References

1977 albums
Bennie Maupin albums
Mercury Records albums